The Church of the Nativity was a Catholic parish church in the Catholic Archdiocese of New York, located at 44 Second Avenue between Second and 3rd Streets in the East Village neighborhood of Manhattan, New York City. It was established in 1842 and permanently closed in 2015.

History
Nativity parish was founded by Rev. Andrew Byrne. Byrne purchased the former Second Avenue Presbyterian Church, which was dedicated by Bishop John Hughes on June 5, 1842. Two years later, Byrne was named Bishop of Little Rock. George McCloskey was pastor for over twenty-years, until in 1869 he resigned to become vicar general for his brother, Bishop William McCloskey of Louisville.
  
When St. John the Baptist Church on West 30th Street burned down in 1847, pastorship of St. John's parish was assumed by the Church of the Nativity until St. John's was rebuilt in 1851. On January 20, 1912, a fire broke out at Nativity, destroying the "historic organ" and interior.

In November 2014, the archdiocese announced that the Church of the Nativity was one of 31 of its parishes which would be merged with other parishes.  The church celebrated its final Mass on July 31, 2015. The church was closed on August 1, 2015, and merged with nearby Most Holy Redeemer Parish.

The church was deconsecrated in June 2017. The church building was sold in 2020, for $40 million to real-estate developer. It had been suggested by some parishioners, that the church should be turned into a shrine for Dorothy Day, co-founder of the Catholic Worker Movement and candidate for sainthood. The Archdiocese said they would look into the idea, but the 2017 deconsecration and subsequent sale in 2020, seemed to make it clear that the idea would not move forward.

Buildings

The original painted-timber Greek Revival sanctuary was built in 1832 at 48 Second Avenue as the Second Avenue Presbyterian Church and was designed by the prominent New York firm of Town & Davis, which then included Alexander Jackson Davis, J. H. Dakin, and James Gallier. It consisted of a Greek Doric portico and two-stage steeple. In 1842, it was sold to the newly formed Nativity of Our Lord parish and became the Church of the Nativity. It was demolished in 1970, after a fire.

The present Modernist church was built at 44 Second Avenue from 1968 to 1970 for $240,000 to the designs of Genovese & Maddalene. It has been described as "starkly institutional" and "a modern architectural cartoon exhibiting a gross idea with no detail."

The parish included within its territory the headquarters of the Catholic Worker Movement and was the site of the Funeral Mass of its co-founder, Dorothy Day, in December 1980.

References 
Notes

External links

Jesuit churches in the United States
Roman Catholic churches completed in 1970
Religious organizations established in 1842
Alexander Jackson Davis buildings
Demolished churches in New York City
Demolished buildings and structures in Manhattan
Modernist architecture in New York City
Roman Catholic churches in Manhattan
East Village, Manhattan
1842 establishments in New York (state)
Defunct organizations based in New York (state)
Religious organizations disestablished in 2015
Closed churches in the Roman Catholic Archdiocese of New York
20th-century Roman Catholic church buildings in the United States